The Tower of Sant'Amanza is a ruined Genoese tower located in the commune of Bonifacio on the south east coast of the Corsica. Only the round base survives.

The tower was one of a series of coastal defences constructed by the Republic of Genoa between 1530 and 1620 to stem the attacks by Barbary pirates.

The Conservatoire du littoral, a French government agency responsible for the protection of outstanding natural areas on the coast, has announced that it intends to purchase the Punta di u Capicciolu headland. As of 2017 it had acquired .

See also
List of Genoese towers in Corsica

References

Towers in Corsica